Norbert Klemens Strotmann Hoppe (born 14 August 1946 in Riesenbeck-Hörstel) is a Roman Catholic bishop.

Strotmann Hoppe was born in Germany and was ordained to the priesthood in 1973. He served as auxiliary bishop of the Roman Catholic Archdiocese of Lima, Peru, from 1992 to 1997. He has served as bishop of the Roman Catholic Diocese of Chosica since 1997.

Notes

External links

1946 births
People from Hörstel
Living people
German Roman Catholic bishops in South America
20th-century Roman Catholic bishops in Peru
21st-century Roman Catholic bishops in Peru
German emigrants to Peru
20th-century German Roman Catholic priests
Roman Catholic bishops of Chosica
Roman Catholic bishops of Lima